Turkmeneli, also known as Turkmenland, and historically as Turcomania, is a political term used to define the vast swath of territory in which the Iraqi Turkmens historically have had a dominant population. The term incorporates the Iraqi Turkmen/Turkoman homelands running from Iraq's border with Turkey and Syria and diagonally down the country to the border with Iran.

In particular, the Turkmen/Turkoman consider the capital of Turkmeneli to be disputed city of Kirkuk and its boundaries also include Tal Afar, Mosul (second largest city in Iraq), Erbil (capital of Kurdistan Region), Mandali, and Tuz Khurmatu. According to Liam Anderson and Gareth Stansfield, the Turkmen/Turkoman note that the term "Turcomania" – an Anglicized version of "Turkmeneli" – appears on a maps of the region published by William Guthrie and Adolf Stieler, however, there is no clear reference to Turkmeneli until the end of the twentieth century.
Regions of Iraq

The Turkmen/Turkoman homeland
The Iraqi Turkmen/Turkomans generally consider several major cities, and small districts associated with these cities, as part of their homeland. The major cities claimed to be a part of Turkmeneli, in a north-to-south order, include: Mosul, Erbil, Kirkuk, Tuz Khurmatu (maybe sometimes even Tikrit) and Tal Afar, Sancar Altun Kupri, Kifri, Khanaqin, Kizil Ribat, Bakuba and Mendeli. Consequently, the Turkmeneli region lies between the Arab areas of settlement to the south and Kurdish areas to the north.

Prospects of an autonomous region

According to Khalil Osman there has been "a raft of federalist schemes" proposed by various Turkmen/Turkoman political parties. For example, one controversial proposal to set up Turkmeneli as a Turkmen/Turkoman autonomous region included the areas northwest of Iraq, from Tal Afar in Nineveh Governorate, through Kirkuk Governorate and Tuz Khurmatu District in Saladin Governorate in north-central Iraq, to Mandali in the Diyala Governorate in the northeast of Baghdad.

Vahram Petrosian suggests that the Iraqi Turkmen Front's (ITF) forwarding of the idea of the recognition of Turkmeneli may pave the way for a future Kurdish-Turkmen conflict.

In 2016 Wassim Bassem reported that the Turkmen/Turkoman have been calling for their own independent province in the Tal Afar district. Their demands had coincided with calls for the establishment of other new provinces for the Christian and the Yazidi minorities.

On 17 July 2017, Turkmen representatives proposed that Tal Afar and Tuz Khurmatu become an autonomous Turkmen region and asked for a "special status" for Kirkuk at a summit in Baghdad under the name "Future of Turkmens in United Iraq". They also called for "training and equipping the Turkmen Hashd al-Shaabi forces."

Gallery

See also
 Iraqi Turkmen Front
 Türkmeneli TV
 Flag of Turkmeneli

References

Bibliography

Further reading

External links

Geography of Iraq
Cultural regions
Iraqi Turkmens
Turkic toponyms
Turkish nationalism